I Will is the debut LP recording by MoZella, released in 2006

Track listing

Production

MoZella albums
2006 albums
Maverick Records albums
Pop rock albums by American artists